"Birthday" is a song recorded by South Korean girl group Red Velvet for their sixth special extended play The ReVe Festival 2022 – Birthday. It was released as the EP's lead single by SM Entertainment on November 28, 2022.

Background and release
On October 28, 2022, SM Entertainment announced Red Velvet would be releasing a new album in November 2022. On November 7, it was announced the group will be releasing their sixth special extended play titled The ReVe Festival 2022 – Birthday, alongside the lead single "Birthday", on November 28. On November 27, the music video teaser was released. The song was released alongside its music video and the EP on November 28.

Composition
"Birthday" was written by Kim Min-ji of Jam Factory, composed and arranged primarily by Issac Han, Aaron Kim, Ghostchild Ltd, and Loosen Door, alongside Ejae and Kole for the composition. It was described a dance-pop song that samples George Gershwin's composition Rhapsody in Blue, featuring R&B, trap, drum, and synth rhythm with lyrics about "returning to the birthday of the person you like and making all of your dreams come true, giving yourself a day to remember". "Birthday" was composed in the key of B-flat minor, with a tempo of 150 beats per minute.

Music video
The "whimsical" music video directed by Kim Hyun-soo of Segaji was released alongside the song by SM Entertainment on November 28, 2022. It portrays Red Velvet's members "being transported into a kaleidoscopic imaginary world constructed from giant pieces of chocolate and candy" where each members "has their own surreal world" with scenes that switches "[imaginary world] where Seulgi performs with traditional Korean lion dancer" to "another [world] where Wendy sings in a garden modelled after a chessboard".

Commercial performance
"Birthday" debuted at number 23 on South Korea's Circle Digital Chart in the chart issue dated November 27 – December 3, 2022. on its component charts, it debuted at number six on the Circle Download Chart, number 43 on the Circle Streaming Chart, and number 88 on the Circle BGM Chart. The song also debuted at number 14 on the Billboard South Korea Songs in the chart issue dated December 10, 2022.

Promotion
Prior to the release of The ReVe Festival 2022 – Birthday, on November 28, 2022, the group held a live event on YouTube and TikTok to introduce the EP and its song, including "Birthday", and to communicate with their fans. They subsequently performed on three music programs in the first week: KBS's Music Bank on December 2, MBC's Show! Music Core on December 3, and SBS's Inkigayo on December 4. On the second week, they performed on Music Bank on December 9, Show! Music Core on December 10, and Inkigayo on December 11.

Credits and personnel
Credits adapted from the liner notes of The ReVe Festival 2022 – Birthday.

Studio
 SM Big Shot Studio – recording
 SM Yellow Tail Studio – recording
 SM Ssam Studio – recording
 SM Blue Ocean Studio – mixing
 SM Lvyin Studio – digital editing
 821 Sound Mastering – mastering

Personnel

 SM Entertainment – executive producer
 Lee Soo-man – producer
 Lee Sung-soo – production director, executive supervisor
 Tak Young-joon – executive supervisor
 Yoo Young-jin – music and sound supervisor
 Red Velvet (Irene, Seulgi, Wendy, Joy, Yeri) – vocals, background vocals
 Ejae – background vocals, composition
 Kim Min-ji – lyrics
 Kole – composition
 Isaac Han – composition, arrangement
 Aaron Kim – composition, arrangement
 Ghostchild Ltd – composition, arrangement
 Loosen Door – composition, arrangement
 MinGtion – vocal directing
 Lee Min-kyu – recording
 Noh Min-ji – recording
 Kang Eun-ji – recording
 Kim Chul-soon – mixing
 Lee Ji-hong – digital editing
 Kwon Nam-woo – mastering

Charts

Weekly charts

Monthly charts

Accolades

Release history

References

Red Velvet (group) songs
2022 singles
2022 songs
Korean-language songs
SM Entertainment singles